Socrates Tuttle (November 19, 1819 – February 12, 1885) was the Mayor of Paterson, New Jersey from 1871 to 1872.

Biography
He was born on November 19, 1819 in Colebrook, New Hampshire to Horatio Tuttle and Betsey Thomas. He had two children, Hobart Tuttle and Jennie Tuttle Hobart. He died of angina pectoris in 1885.

References

1819 births
1885 deaths
Mayors of Paterson, New Jersey
19th-century American politicians
New Jersey Republicans